General elections were held in Honduras in October 1915. Francisco Bertrand of the National Party was the only candidate in the presidential election, and was elected unopposed. As the incumbent, Bertrand had been constitutionally barred from contesting the elections, but had avoided the rule by resigning in favour of his vice president Alberto Membreño three months before the election.

Results

President

References

Bibliography
Durón, Rómulo.  Bosquejo histórico de Honduras.  Tegucigalpa: Baktun Editorial.  Third edition. 1982.  
Stokes, William S. Honduras: an area study in government. Madison: University of Wisconsin Press. 1950. 
Zúñiga Huete, José Angel.  Presidentes de Honduras.  México.  Two volumes. 1987.  

Elections in Honduras
Honduras
1915 in Honduras
Single-candidate elections
Presidential elections in Honduras
October 1916 events
Election and referendum articles with incomplete results